Kevin Brett Yorn (born July 4, 1965) is an American entertainment attorney who co-founded Yorn Barnes Levine Entertainment Law Firm where he is managing partner.

Early life and education
Yorn is an alumnus of Muhlenberg College in Allentown, PA. He graduated with a Juris Doctor degree from Tulane University Law School. Yorn was admitted to The State Bar of California in 1991. Yorn has collaborated with Tulane University, his alma mater and created funds to promote entertainment and media law at Tulane Law School as well as to support the Gender & Sexuality Studies program in the School of Liberal Arts.

Career 

Yorn became a deputy district attorney in L.A. County after graduating from Tulane Law in 1990. He was in the D.A.’s office for five years, working in the Hardcore Gang Investigations Unit.

After the D.A's office, Yorn partnered with Kevin Morris, a lawyer he met through his brother, Rick Yorn. Aspiring writer Anthony Zuiker asked Yorn for help in escaping a screenwriting contract so that he could go on to create the television series CSI.

In 2013, Yorn worked on the deal to renew DeGeneres' talk show through 2016-17.

In the summer of 2014, Yorn's firm made a deal with Hulu for three years of South Park reruns, reportedly at a price of more than $80 million, and he helped Zuiker make content deals with YouTube and Yahoo. Yorn also created a joint venture with Warner Bros., Ellen DigitalVentures, to help take advantage of Ellen DeGeneres’ social media reach, digital video content, games and apps, including Heads Up!.

Yorn was listed among The Hollywood Reporter’s Top 100 Entertainment Attorneys in 2013 and 2014, and was named one of Hollywood's top power lawyers in 2015, 2016, and 2018.

Personal life 
Yorn's brother Pete Yorn is a musician. Yorn's brother, Rick, is a talent manager. The three brothers make up what Nikki Finke calls, "The Yorn Dynasty"  The brothers grew up in Montville, New Jersey with their father, Dr. Lawrence Yorn, a dentist who was a captain in the Army, and mother, Joan. Yorn's parents moved to Los Angeles in 2000. Joan Yorn is a receptionist at Kevin Yorn's law firm.

In 1996, he married film producer Julie Silverman in a Jewish ceremony in Tarrytown, New York. They later divorced in 2005.

References

External links
 
 

Living people
1965 births
Jewish American attorneys
American entertainment lawyers
21st-century American Jews